Founded in 2009, "Runningland Metrology & Testing (Shanghai) Co., Ltd" is a Shanghai-based accredited third party laboratory that specializes in instruments metering, condition monitoring, calibration and testing petrochemical products. The company was founded by David Zhou, who is an active member of STLE (Society of Tribologists and Lubrication Engineers) ASTM D2 Committee, and SAE (Society of Automotive Engineers), and co-founded by Ti Zhou who is a member of Shanghai Lubrication Trade Association. As a commercial third party laboratory, the organization also collaborates with educational institutions and research associations across China. Oil analysis is still a relatively developing idea and has become an increasingly important concept in The People's Republic of China. Because the oil analysis market in China is growing, Runningland has developed a lab that specializes in grease testing. In 2015, STLE has published a report indicating its previous activities and plans to expand into the China market by organizing the China Advisory Council, which consists of 15 prominent members of China's lubrication industry including David Zhou, Chairman and Co-founder of Runningland.

Annual Cooperation with The Shanghai Lubricant Association
Runningland cooperates with the Shanghai Lubricant Association by providing training facilities and consultants. Annual training sessions and examination were held in 2010 and 2009 respectively in the area of Oil Analysis and Lubrication Analysis. Runningland's facilities have hosted training sessions for trainees, introducing them to newly improved testing methods revised annually by GB (Domestic), ASTM, ISO, and IP. The Shanghai Lubricant Association works closely with industry-related institutions and enterprises, making contributions to the development and progress of the Lubricant Industry in China.

Laboratory Accreditation

During 2010, Runningland Metrology & Testing (Shanghai) Company has been accredited with ISO/IEC 17025:2005 "General Requirements for Competence of Testing and Calibration Laboratories", (CNAS-CL01"Testing and Calibration Laboratory Competence Accreditation Criteria"). Runningland was accredited by CNAS (China National Accreditation Service for Conformity Assessment) with registration No. CNAS L5287.

In order to demonstrate competence in carrying out specified testing, measurement and calibration, CNAS (China National Accreditation Committee) is the Standardization Administration of China. To ensure participation and meet international standards, 44 national bodies including the former China National Accreditation committee for Laboratories (now replaced by CNAS), signed a Memorandum of Understanding in September 1996. During 2000 and 2001, CNACL have signed the International Laboratory Accreditation Cooperation ILAC Mutual Recognition Arrangement and three years later, CNAL have signed ILAC-MRA. CNACL was later replaced by CNAS as China's National Accreditation committee and carries forth the MRA-ILAC signatory.

Testing History

Since its founding in 2009, Runningland have been providing Oil Analytical Services, Equipment Lubrication, and Condition Monitoring to both multinational and domestic companies. Although a newly founded company, laboratory capabilities and testing equipment has grown extensively throughout the 2-3 year period. A vast majority of equipment used by the laboratory are purchased from European and US based companies such as Cannon Instruments, Metrohm, and Koehler Instrument Company, Inc. To determine testing strengths and weaknesses, Runningland has participated in worldwide inter-laboratory cross-check proficiency programs organized by ASTM and CNAS.

Testing Equipment

Examples of Runningland's Testing and Analytical equipment inventory are as follows:

Specific Tests Conducted

References

Companies based in Shanghai
Business services companies established in 2009
Privately held companies of China
Chinese companies established in 2009